Tsarevna was the daughter of a Tsar of Russia before the 18th century. The name is meant as a daughter of a Tsar, or as a wife of a Tsarevich.

All of them were unmarried, and grew old in convents or in the Terem Palace, with the exception of the daughters of Ivan V. Notably, Ivan V's daughter Catherine married duke Karl Leopold of Mecklenburg-Schwerin.

See also
 Tsarevich
 Tsesarevna of Russia - wife of the heir Tsesarevna in Russian Empire.
 List of Grand Duchesses of Russia

References

Titles
Russian royalty